The 2009–10 season was Panathinaikos' 51st consecutive season in Super League Greece. The 2009–10 season was very successful for Panathinaikos. At the summer transfer window the club bought Djibril Cissé from Marseille, Kostas Katsouranis from Benfica, Sebastian Leto from Liverpool and various other players spending more than €35 million. The team managed to enter the final 16 of Europa League and win the Greek Championship. Panathinaikos completed the domestic double by winning the Greek Cup final.

Current squad 

''As of 9 September 2009.

Squad changes for 2009–10

In

 on a free transfer
 for €8 million
 for €4 million
 for €0.45 million
 for €0.2 million
 on a free transfer
 for €3 million

total spending : 15,650,000 €

Out

 on a free transfer

 on a free transfer
 on a free transfer

Out on loan

Club

Management

Competitions

Super League Greece

Regular season

League table

Matches

Greek Cup

Fourth round

Fifth round

Quarter-finals

Semi-finals

Final

UEFA Champions League

Qualifying phase

Third qualifying round

Play-off round

UEFA Europa League

Group F

Knockout stage

Round of 32

Round of 16

References

Panathinaikos F.C. seasons
Panathinaikos
Greek football championship-winning seasons